Feridun Sungur  (born 2 January 1984) is a Turkish former professional footballer who played as a defender, spending most of his career in Turkey.

Career
Sungur was born in Arsin, Turkey.

In July 2005 he returned to his former Trabzonspor.

He has also played for A. Sebatspor, Karşıyaka S.K., Elazığspor and Giresunspor.

References

External links
 
 

1984 births
People from Arsin, Turkey
Living people
Turkish footballers
Turkey youth international footballers
Association football defenders
Trabzonspor footballers
Akçaabat Sebatspor footballers
Karşıyaka S.K. footballers
Elazığspor footballers
Samsunspor footballers
Denizlispor footballers
Giresunspor footballers
Turanspor footballers
Tokatspor footballers
Sarıyer S.K. footballers
1461 Trabzon footballers
Eyüpspor footballers
Süper Lig players
TFF First League players
TFF Second League players
Mediterranean Games silver medalists for Turkey
Mediterranean Games medalists in football
Competitors at the 2005 Mediterranean Games
Turkish expatriate footballers
Turkish expatriate sportspeople in Northern Cyprus
Expatriate footballers in Northern Cyprus